These are the official results of the Women's 100 metres event at the 1983 IAAF World Championships in Helsinki, Finland. There were a total number of 49 participating athletes, with seven qualifying heats and the final held on Monday 1983-08-08.

At the start, Koch and Ashford were out fast, and even until 40 metres into the race when Ashford pulled up with a hamstring injury.  Göhr gained steadily on her teammate Koch, passing her at 80 meters.  Sensing a further challenge from Diane Williams - who had crossed from her lane 6 to her left and front of Merlene Ottey in Lane 5, Koch leaned at the finish to hold on to second.

Medalists

Records
Existing records at the start of the event.

Final

Semifinals
Held on Monday 1983-08-08

Quarterfinals
Held on Sunday 1983-08-07

Qualifying heats
Held on Sunday 1983-08-07

References
 Results

 
100 metres at the World Athletics Championships
1983 in women's athletics